Palaephatus latus is a moth of the  family Palaephatidae. It is found in the Arauco
Province of Chile.

The length of the forewings is 4.8–5 mm. Adults have uniformly fuscous wings, reflecting a slight bronzy iridescence. They are on wing in October in one generation per year.

Etymology
The specific name is derived from Latin latus (meaning broad or wide) and refers to the unusually broad male genital capsule.

References

Moths described in 1986
Palaephatidae
Taxa named by Donald R. Davis (entomologist)
Endemic fauna of Chile